The Interpretation Acts 1948 and 1967 is a Malaysian law which enacted to provide for the commencement, application, construction, interpretation and operation of written laws; to provide for matters in relation to the exercise of statutory powers and duties; and for matters connected therewith.

Structure
The Interpretation Acts 1948 and 1967, in its current form (1 January 2006), consists of 3 Parts containing 15 divisions, 132 sections and 2 schedules (including 18 amendments).
 Part I
 Division One: Meaning of Certain Expressions and References
 Division Two: Provisions Affecting Written Laws Generally
 Division Three: Powers and Appointments
 Division Four: Miscellaneous
 Part II
 Division Five: Definitions
 Division Six: General Provisions Regarding Acts of Parliament, Ordinances and Enactments
 Division Seven: Repeal, Re-enactment and Amending Legislation
 Division Eight: Imperial Acts
 Division Nine: Subsidiary Legislation
 Division Ten: Powers and Appointments
 Division Eleven: Distance and Time
 Division Twelve: Miscellaneous
 Division Thirteen: Reprint of Written Laws
 Division Fourteen: Penal Provisions
 Division Fifteen: Repeal
 Part III
 Schedules

See also
 Interpretation Act

External links
 Interpretation Acts 1948 and 1967 

1948 in British Malaya
Legal history of British Malaya
1948 in law
1967 in Malaysian law
Malaysian federal legislation